is a Japanese tokusatsu television series based on Takara Tomy's Tomica toy car line. A sequel to Tomica Hero: Rescue Force, Rescue Fire tells of another branch of the United Fire-Defense Agency that helps save people from Super-Fire created by demons seeking to make people suffer. This series marks the beginning as well as an end of a program franchise dubbed the Tomica Hero Series. The Tomica Hero story was concluded in the special stage production Nissan Haul Special Live Stage FINAL that featured the return of Obuchi, a new R4, and the return of the original R4.

Characters

The United Fire-Defense Agency/Rescue Fire
The Rescue Force team was sent overseas and is currently based in the Europe branch. The Rescue Fire team disbanded temporarily after the final battle in the last episode, only to be reassembled a year later. The artificial satellite  detects a Super-Fire.
: The rookie member of Rescue Fire, donning an orange suit. His parents were fire fighters who died when he was age 6 around Christmas time, placed in the custody of relatives for two difficult years before enrolling in Himawari School, where he learned to smile from Mie. After graduation, Tatsuya became a fire fighter prior to joining the Rescue Fire team. Though a skilled member and has a burning "Rescue Soul", he is not nearly as professional as his teammates, and tends to get in trouble for his tomfoolery. He loves eating anything with ketchup on it and is a recycler by nature. After the final battle in the last episode, taking Donkaen's words to heart, he travels the world with Q-suke in a soul search to honor of vow to protect the Earth. With the X-Basher, Fire-1 powers up into .
: The emergency medical expert of Rescue Fire, donning a silver suit. His lineage was the Megumi hikeshi. Wanting to be a fire fighter, he promised he would be the best fire fighter to Jiro. Yuma displays a blatant crush on Tama-chan, though his affections have not been returned until the Christmas incident. He later took the most damage when the Commanders made a last-ditch attack on the Rescue Fire team. He was given the Pearl of Faith before it saved his live when he almost flat-lined. After the final battle in the last episode, he marries Tama-chan and joins a volunteer fire corps. Using the Break Axe, he can execute the  attack. He also uses the Tri-Basher in Gun Mode to execute the  attack.
: The female member of Rescue Fire called "Miss Perfect", donning a green suit. Her father was a top rescuer who died during a Super-Disaster. She left the country and trained in America before joining the Rescue Fire team. She likes animals and has a good knowledge of animals. Though curious as to why someone like Tatsuya is a member of the team, she begins to slowly realize the reason behind it and open up to her teammates. While hospitalized, before the final battle, Tatsuya gives her the Pearl of Purity. After the final battle in the last episode, she serves as a training instructress of the UFDA.
: A member of the Rescue Fire's , donning a black suit. He attended an American university prior to joining the UFDA, being Ritsuka's rival with the intent on outdoing her under the impression she was Fire-1. But after seeing someone with less experience than her is Fire-1, Tsubasa refuses to acknowledge Tatsuya's abilities. Although he still considers Ritsuka his rival, he realizes his feelings for her, yet is always interrupted when he is about to confess. While hospitalized, before the final battle, Tatsuya gives him the Pearl of Love. After the final battle, Tsubasa serves as good publicity for the UFDA.
: A member of the Sky Team, donning a light blue suit. He wears plain glasses. While hospitalized, before the final battle, Tatsuya gives him the Pearl of Joy. After the final battle, he joins the helicopter unit of Tokyo Fire Department and serves as the captain of the unit.
: The captain of the Rescue Fire, using that title to become a test subject in the development of Fire Suits 1–5, eventually becoming unable to don his own Fire Suit. His parents in Hokkaido run a livestock farm. After the final battle in the last episode, he serves as a seminar instructor of the UFDA.
: A cafeteria worker nicknamed , she researches many dishes to make ideal food that makes people happy. Her parents in Nagoya City run a restaurant. After the final battle in the last episode, she marries Yuma.
When the X-Dragon is complete, Osakabe personally helped Tatsuya rekindle his Rescue Soul so he could pilot it.
: The head of United Fire-Defense Agency's vehicle maintenance, first introducing himself to Tatsuya while getting the medium Rescue Force Vehicles ready from their transfer to the Europe branch. He later finished repairs on the Rescue Striker after its destruction by Kanitanken.
: The chief of the UFDA's . At present she is working with the Rescue Force at the Europe branch and came to Japan to see if the Rescue Fire team can properly form the Great Wyvern.

Allies
: An archaeologist and Riku and Marimo's older brother, his hobby is to develop original tools while running the Taiga Archaeology Lab. He took orders from Osakabe and found out the slate about the Jakaen and the Ryudouken inside a pyramid in Egypt. Once acquiring it, he brought the tablet to Japan.
: Riku and Marimo's niece and Naoshi's daughter and assistant, she carries a pendant with a blue stone given by the elder in Mongolia that reawakes water dragons of the five Blue Pearls connected to the Ryudouken used to seal Donkaen.
: Yuma's father who is the foreman of a construction worker.
: Yuma's mother who runs the  monjayaki restaurant.
: Yuma's friend who is a construction worker and took Yuma's place in becoming the best at his company. He has a son named .
: Tatsuya's childhood friend from the  orphanage. When he meets her again, she has become a teacher at the school. She eventually becomes engaged to Tatsuya's dismay before he finally accepted it.
: The team created to protect human lives from various disasters too extreme for normal rescue workers. By the time of Rescue Fire's formation, the Rescue Force team is transferred to the Europe branch. They fought a Super-Fire caused by Sakaen in London, eventually returning to Japan to help the Rescue Fire team out.
: The last remaining member of the Rescue Force team before being transferred to Europe.
: A male member.
: A female member.
: A female member.
: The leader of Rescue Force. Like the rest of his team, he is transferred to the Europe branch, welcoming Taiga during his visit.
: Jun's father and the CEO of  who wants Jun to quit the UFDA and succeed him as the CEO.
: Tama-chan's childhood friend who is a member of the Hyper Rescue Nagoya team.
: Riku and Naoshi's younger sister and Asuka's aunt who works on her parents' livestock farm.
: A manga artist who is drawing a manga called  and a former fire fighter who was Tsubasa's senpai until an accident rendered him to a wheelchair. He wants his younger sister  to give up her dream of becoming a fire fighter for her own good before he finally accepts her decision.

Jakaen
The  are a group of fire demons who gave humans fire long ago. However, after seeing their gift used for selfish reasons to the point of endangering the Earth, the Jakaen made it their goal to make people suffer by causing . Sealed long ago by a warrior with the freezing powers of five Blue Pearls, the Jakaen's release into the world was the reason for the formation of the Rescue Fire team. Their original base of operations was underneath Tateishi City, making it the site of most Jakaen attacks until Donkaen's first defeat by Fire-1 X.

Though his true form was a giant dragon with three additional heads on his body, Donkaen assumed a giant fireball-like form when he divided his full power into the Three Commanders, normally resting on a fire cauldron. Originally sealed within the North Pole by the ancient warrior, he is revived by global warming and recreates the Jakaen to have his revenge. Though he played with Fire-1, Donkaen gets serious when his opponent gains the X-Basher, eating the Commanders for their powers to assume an incomplete version of his true form, unable to grow his additional heads, before being defeated by Rescue King's X Crash. He survived, but is now much smaller and resting in a stone shrine until he decides to enter the center of Earth to rest within the magma to restore himself to true form while reaffirming his conviction. Making his return after killing off Joukaen, Donkaen sends the Commanders after the Pearl of Love while he goes after the Pearl of Friendship in Mongolia. But realizing the Pearl's not in the country, Don Kaen leaves for space and becomes a second sun to intensify the heat on Earth to the point of melting the ice caps. Overpowering Great Wyvern GX, Donkaen battles Rescue King after losing his additional heads, trapping the giant robot within the giant sun. But with the Blue Pearls, Fire-1 stops Donkaen yet chooses not to destroy him and pleas for peace. But Donkaen refuses to listen, forcing Fire 1-X to freeze Donkaen while promising him that he'll save the world. Though Donkaen accepts his fate and drifts into deep space, he vowed that he will return should Tatsuya fail to keep his promise.
: Created by Donkaen, they carry out the task of attacking humanity for him. They each master a technique called  that allows them to enhance their Fire Majin. When defeated, a Commander is subjected to torture in the form of cool-tasting treats like ice cream before Donkaen resorts to punishments related to each Commander's recent scheme. Through Jokaen, whose power boost causes their weapons to turn red, the Three Commanders not only assume Fire Majin forms called , but also  forms like  and the Triple Gattaien . They are sent by Joukaen to lure the Fire Rescue Team away from the Fire Phoenix while he hijacks it. Though pumped up their strongest, the three are defeated by Fire-1 X and the Sky Team. Taking Qsuke hostage, the Commanders fall for his Trojan trap to get the Rescue Fire team into the Fire Phoenix before GaiaLeon drives them off. After Donkaen's return, the Three Commanders are sent to Lake Motosu to find the Pearl of Love and destroy it. Evaporating the lake from all sides, the Commanders assume their UkaSakaChukaen form to take out the revealed Pearl of Love while causing a massive forest fire. They overpower both the dragon and Great Wyvern GX until the Pearl of Friendship reveals itself, with UkaSakaChukaen shattered by the Great Wyvern Attack. Near death, the Commanders make a final attempt on the Rescue Fire team before they are reabsorbed, their faces appearing on Donkaen's additional heads. They were frozen by the Super Fire Dragon, the Super Jet Falcon, and the Fire Phoenix before being shattered by the Rescue King, surviving the attack as they resume their usual forms while attempting to revive Donkaen before deciding to find another planet to live on in peace.
: The female executive who mainly creates Fire Majin from plants, using a peacock-feathered war fan as her weapon. Her appearance is based on a cobra and a pharaoh, her Hyper Kaen form being a four-eyed naga version of herself with wings for arms that enable her to fly. Being the cook, she is irate that Sakaen and Ukaen would prefer the cooking of Manpuku Town to her own. As a result, Chukaen goes to the town and captures the chiefs to prove her superiority to them while using them to capture the Rescue Fire members. But she is challenged by Tama-chan, losing to her and baring a grudge against her since. Taking Jokaen to where the Fire Phoenix is normally stationed, Chukaen is consumed in Jokaen's flames and overpowers the Rescue Fire team and Fire-5 until Fire-1 X defeats her. But Jokaen revives her as a Hyper Kaen as Rescue King and the Super Jet Falcon drive her off. Chukaen and her Fire Majin later attacked Sydney in order to keep the Sky Team and GaiaLeon from interfering with Jokaen's plan. On Valentine's Day, her plan to selling explosive chocolate is ruined as Joukaen turns her into the Hyper Gattaien  before being defeated by the Cerberus Dragon and then shattered by the Wyvern Cannon.
: A tactician who mainly creates Fire Majin from machines, he is the first to attack after revealing the existence of the Rescue Fire team to their master. His appearance is based on a Chinese Dragon wrapped around his body. His weapon is a rod with a dragon's head that doubles as a sword, his Hyper Kaen being a warrior version of himself with a spear as his weapon. Getting personal information on Tatsuya, Ukaen uses Roboten to torch Himawari School before piloting it under it is defeated by the Super Fire Dragon. After escaping a pumped up Fire-1, Donkaen gives Ukaen a power boost that nearly kills him. While in his powered state, later given an improved version of his cane to control his power, Ukaen could destroy a city block easily as well as create giant Fire Majin without using Revenge Fire. Jokaen later uses Ukaen to cause a fire on Midori Hill in a plan to lure out the Rescue Fire teams and take them out one by one until Gaia Leon intervenes and sends Hyper Ukaen flying. Soon after a failed attempt to get the X-Basher, Ukaen is combined with a Katchuen to form the Hyper Gattaien  before being blasted off by the Wyvern Cannon. He and his Fire Majin later distracted the Rescue Fire team during Jokaen's plan. While at Nagoya, Ukaen attempts to propose to weather lady Azusa Naganuma to fill the void in his life, only to have his heart broken and form a grudge against Tsubasa when he later kidnapped Nana Misaki before Jokaen uses the girl's pocket knife to turn Ukaen the Hyper Gattaien  prior to being shattered by the Super Jet Falcon. During R1's visit to Japan, Ukaen is turned into a chemical vat after he and Sakaen are sent flying by Jokaen. His residual energy turns it into when he dubs Dangerous Slime as he intends to use it to cause a Super Disaster. But Fire-1X and R-1 Max defeat him and Sakaen, forcing them to combine with a group of Kanikaen to form the Triple Hyper Gattaien  before being shattered by the Cerberus Dragon.
: A strongman who mainly creates Fire Majin from animals, he uses a morning star as his weapon and can shoot his ball-like fists out on chains and retract them back into place. His appearance is based on a volcanic island and his Hyper Kaen form is a gorilla-like version of himself riding on a balancing ball much like the spheres he holds. He also has an allergic reaction to eggs and a thing for Tama-chan. Infused with Jokaen's flames after he uses him and his fellow commanders in extreme variations of games like soccer and bowling, Sakaen lures out the Rescue Fire team by wrecking everything in sight, even attacking his own allies. Though Fire-1 X defeats him, Jokaen revives him as a Hyper Kaen before Rescue King sends him flying. He was enhanced again and was sent flying after being defeated from GaiaLeon's Final Rescue. He later is combined with Chukaen into Hyper SakaChukaen before being defeated by the Great Wyvern GX. Later used in Jokaen's plan to get back at the Rescue Fire team through Jun's father, Sakaen battles Fire 5 before being defeated by Fire-1 X. However, Jokaen combines Sakaen with a Haekaen to form the Hyper Gattaien  before being shattered by the Wyvern Cannon. Sakaen and his Fire Majin later attacked London in order to keep the Rescue Force team from interfering with Jokaen's plan.
: Jakaen's top commander, he originally attempted to set up relations to stop the war between his kind and the humans. However, seeing his actions as an act of betrayal, Donkaen secretly arranges it that Joukaen would be sealed by the humans within the South Pole. But in the present, due to the Rescue Fire nearly extinguishing him, Donkaen releases Jokaen to serve as acting leader. The ordeal of being betrayed results with Joukaen becoming an insane lunatic in personality who trusts no one and enjoys the suffering of others, his face becoming an upside down face illusion, having a usual happy face that slips into an enraged face when Jokaen gets serious. He uses a scissors sword as his weapon. He masters a technique that allows him to enhance the Three Commanders into Fire Majin forms using his fire as turn them into Hyper Kaen with his feather. Jokaen spends his freedom embracing the modern times but kept getting bored after using the commanders in various games for his amusement, until he uses Sakaen to cause a rampage as the Rescue Fire team arrives. Shooting his flames across the city, he attracts Fire-1's attention, reminding of the warrior whom he was betrayed by as he forms a rivalry based on their ideals. During Christmas time, Jokaen sends the Commanders to the three corners of the World to distract the UFDA rescue branches as he hijacks a space shuttle to make his way towards  to change its trajectory towards Earth. After fighting Fire-1 X on the comet's surface and losing the purified Blue Orb in the process, Jokaen fuses into Soho to become the two-faced Hyper Gattaien . However, the Great Wyvern GX manages to freeze Suiseien before he can enter Earth's atmosphere and shatter him with Great Wyvern Attack. But Jokaen survived and recuperated in the magma under Nagoya City, causing a heatwave in the city before obtaining the Blue Pearl of Joy and tainted it into a pearl of  that gives him super speed. After a duel with Fire-1 X, knowing his time has almost run out on him, Joukaen decides to finish off the Rescue Fire team by hijacking the Fire Phoenix while taking Mie and Taiga hostage as he forces the Rescue fire team to disarm themselves. When the Rescue Fire team regain the Fire Phoenix, Joukaen challenges Fire 1-X to a final duel while clashing ideologies. Though he uses the pearl to assume Hyper Kaen form, Joukaen is defeated. But shocked that Fire 1-X spares him, Joukaen's face returns to his normal as his faith in humanity is rekindled. Attempting to ask the revived Donkaen to reconsider their fight, Joukaen learns Donkaen's part in his sealing. Enraged to find out he was betrayed by his own kind, Joukaen attacks Donkaen, but was eventually killed and sank in the magma.
: The Jakasts are the Jakaen foot soldiers, who constantly chant .

Fire Majin
The Super-Fire causing  are created by the Three Commanders from a  they each carry which whirls to life once exposed to a heat source and enters the nearest object in the area, taking its physical form before going on a rampage to seek vengeance. A Fire Majin can be enlarged and upgraded by commanders' Revenge Fire. Two or more Fire Majin can merge into a more powerful  when their commanders engage Revenge Fire at the same time. Since Jokaen's appearance, the Fire Majin are not used much other than boost up a commander's power as a Hyper Gattaien.
: A smoldering motorcycle Fire Majin created to infect other bikes with its flames as part of Ukaen's scheme to attack the city, in order to make it a deadly example to the UFDA for attempting to stop them. When Rescue Fire arrives and Rescue Striker takes out the massive numbers, Ukaen uses his Revenge Fire to combine the remaining bikes into a giant fire-breathing bike monster that takes out Rescue Striker. The tables soon turn when Fire Dragon is scrambled and freezes Biken with Ice Tornado before smashing it with the Dragon Attack. Later, another group of Bikaen were created before Jokaen combines them into the larger  for Ukaen to ride on before it is shattered by RescueKing and Gaia Leon.
: A dog Fire Majin.
: A giant mushroom Fire Majin.
: A mobile phone Fire Majin.
: A crow Fire Majin.
: A banana Fire Majin with a sombrero, the festive Bananaen can shoot banana boomerangs and banana peels as it causes a fire in an elementary school. After being defeated by an enraged Fire-3 attacks it for making her look the fool, Fire-1 defeats the Fire Majin with Blizzard Slash. However, Chukaen uses her Revenge Fire to revive Bananaen into a flying giant peeled version of itself. But the monster is destroyed by the Combination Attack of Fire Dragon and Dozer Dragon. On Valentine's Day, Chukaen creates a variation of Bannanen from a chocolate-coated banana on a stick, as her enforcer with its Choco Banana Boomerangs. After Fire-3 tricks the Fire Majin into attacking its master, she forces it back to its original form.
: A Fire Majin created from the Rescue Drill.
: A fly Fire Majin.
: Created from a toy tank,  was used to take advantage of the Fire Dragon's damage, attacking the Rescue Striker on Ukaen's orders until Sakaen intervene with his crab Fire Majin  in what turned into an all-out brawl before Donkaen forces Ukaen and Sakaen to combine their Fire Majin into a Gattaien to turn the odds in their favor. But after Kanitanken scraps the Rescue Striker, the Super Rescue Dragon is formed and freezing Gattaien with Super Ice Tornado before shattering it with the Super Dragon Attack. Another Kanitanken appears in London, with R1 personally destroying it.
: A Fire Majin created from the combination of the Subaru Sambar pickup truck Fire Majin  and the cabbage Fire Majin .
: A cobra-like snake Fire Majin.
: The combination of the squid Fire Majin  and the box cutter Fire Majin .
: A Fire Majin created from several beans.
: A Fire Majin created from the roots of a lone tree.
: A spider Fire Majin.
: A summer cold virus Fire Majin.
: A Fire Majin made from skyrockets.
Though able to withstand the Final Rescues of the Super Fire Dragon and Super Jet Falcon, Roboikakinokoen is destroyed by the Great Wyvern. Another Roboikakinokoen appeared in Sydney before the Falcon Vehicles destroy it.
: A Fire Majin created from a fake ghost.
: A Fire Majin created from a bouquet of roses.
: A giant knight Fire Majin created from a suit of armor.
: A centipede Fire Majin.
: A koala Fire Majin created from Chiroru, a koala at Higashiyama Zoo and Botanical Gardens, when Sakaen thought he was being brushed off as he intended to have Koalaen wreck Nagoya during its second bicenntial so everyone would hate the koala. Though it appeared to cause trouble, Koalaen was actually scared. Risking his own life, Tatsuya manages to free Chiroru with the formless Fire Majin destroyed with the Wyvern Cannon.
: A Hyper Gattaien formed by  Jokaen created from the shachihoko on Nagoya Castle to have the Fire Majin ironically burn Nagoya. But the Rescue Vehicles and GaiaLeon intervene to give the HyperRescue team time to extinguish the fire as Great Wyvern GX finishes the Hyper Gattaien off.

Rescue Vehicles

Rescue Dashes
The  are the Core Units for the larger Rescue Vehicles, each equipped with a Safety Field barrier. These can be utilized in newer vehicle models for execution of either a Dragon Attack or a Falcon Attack.
: A special regulation Nissan 370Z cruiser assigned to Fire-1; serves as the cockpit for Fire Dragon Rescue Vehicle and Rescue Striker Rescue Vehicle in episode 9.
: A special regulation Nissan Paramedic ambulance assigned to Fire-2; serves as the cockpit for Dozer Dragon Rescue Vehicle.
: A special regulation Nissan Cube assigned to Fire-3; serves as the cockpit for Turbo Dragon Rescue Vehicle and Rescue Striker Rescue Vehicle in episode 1,2,3,4,5 and 7.
: A special regulation Nissan Skyline Coupe assigned to Fire-4; serves as the cockpit for the Jet Falcon.
: A special regulation Nissan X-Trail assigned to Fire-5; serves as the cockpit for the Heli Falcon.
: A special regulation Nissan Murano assigned to Riku.

Rescue Striker
The  is a large-scale water truck Rescue Vehicle assigned to Fire-3 prior to the completion of Turbo Dragon. It was borrowed from Rescue Force. It once combined with the Rescue Drill to become the Drill Striker in order to destroy Drillen with its Final Rescue, Drill Boost. While the Fire Dragon was being repaired, Fire-1 was given the Rescue Striker to pilot until it sacrificed itself to save Fire-1 from Kanitanken's attack. It has since been repaired, and is currently again in use of Rescue Force's R1.

2nd Generation Rescue Vehicles

 The Fire Dragon is a large-scale Rescue Vehicle assigned to Fire-1. It largely facilitates the functions of a fire engine and semi-trailer truck. In Scramble Mode, Fire Dragon functions as auto-transport for the small-scale Rescue Vehicles for immediate transport to the disaster site. Rescue Mode transforms the vehicle bed into a fire fighting apparatus.
 The Dozer Dragon is a medium-scale Rescue Vehicle assigned to Fire-2 which has a bulldozer Rescue Mode, which originally had a flaw in the cooling system that shut the vehicle down after 45 seconds. Other abilities include shooting Dragon Anchor cables. It can also fling another Rescue Vehicle at the target to unleash the other Rescue Vehicle's Final Rescue using the Dragon Bucket in a Combination Attack. It then executes a Dragon Attack with the flaming Rescue Dash-2 to finish the job.
 The Jet Falcon is a large-scale fighter jet Rescue Vehicle assigned to Fire-4. It launches  from wings.
 The Heli Falcon is a medium-scale Rescue Vehicle assigned to Fire-5 which has a fighter jet Scramble Mode and a helicopter Rescue Mode. It shoots  from the nose.

X-Dragon
The  is a large-scale ambulance Rescue Vehicle with AI and VVEL engine assigned to Fire-1, who possessed a strong enough Rescue Soul to use it. It can also remote control it through the Rescue Megaphone. The X-Dragon can also transform into the humanoid  named , able to execute the Final Rescue , which it delivers a powerful fiery punch to the enemy.

GaiaLeon
 is a large-scale driverless Rescue Vehicle with AI and VVEL engine which has an excavator Vehicle Mode and a lion type robot . As a result of being prideful, GaiaLeon acts on his own whim and listens to those he can acknowledge.

Upgraded Medium-scale Rescue Vehicles
These are an upgraded version of the medium-scale Rescue Vehicles based on the same models used by the Rescue Force.
: A drag shovel Rescue Vehicle which can transform into .
: A tank-like Rescue Vehicle with twin drills and a cutoff saw on top. The Black Type also has active camouflage.
: A large blower Rescue Vehicle with a turbofan on it.
: A crane Rescue Vehicle.

Rescue Vehicle Combinations
 The Super Fire Dragon is the combination of all three Dragon Vehicles.
 The Super Jet Falcon is the combination of both Falcon Vehicles.
 The Great Wyvern is the combination of the Super Fire Dragon and the Super Jet Falcon.
 The Rescue King is the humanoid combination of the Fire Dragon and the X-Dragon. Riding on GaiaLeon, Rescue King can combine their signature Final Rescues to execute the Double Impact Double Final Rescue.
 The Great Wyvern GX is the combination of the Great Wyvern, the X-Dragon, and the GaiaLeon. The formation was original inaccessible as Tatsuya is unable to endure the combination until he gains the Blue Pearl of Faith. It is then followed by a  where all five Rescue Dashes are launched at once.
 The Wyvern Cannon is the combination of the Dozer Dragon and Turbo Dragon with the Super Jet Falcon, serving as a cannon for Rescue King. In this mode, the Wyvern Cannon fires a freezing bullet which destroys the enemy in one shot.
 The Cerberus is the combination of the Fire Dragon and all five upgraded medium-scale Rescue Vehicles.

Rescue Tools

Rescue Megaphone
The  is the team's common suit-up tool with AI. Shifting its lever to various modes allows the user to relay commands. Fire-1's Rescue Megaphone is replaced with one possessing a TF-Q robot mode. Nicknamed , the robot is designed to help Tatsuya become more professional. Q-suke is also outfitted with the ability to shoot lasers from his eyes.
FIRE UP: Transforms the user into suit-up form upon the command .
DASH GO: Launches a Rescue Dash vehicle from a Dragon vehicle.
SCRAMBLE: Starts the Rescue Vehicles.
FINAL RESCUE: Executes the Rescue Vehicles' Final Rescue.
DRAGON UP: Combines Dragon vehicles.

Tri-Basher
The  is the team's common rescue tool with three modes.
: Shoots special fire-extinguishing liquid.

Jet Caliber
The  is the Sky Team's common suit-up and rescue tool, normally kept in the Sky Team's Rescue Dash vehicles until needed. It is usually in  until suit-up. Voicing to its microphone on a pommel to various modes allows the user to relay commands. Allows the Sky Team to fly using its  function.
: Its sword guard is a command display and shoots special fire-extinguishing liquid from a fan on it.
SKY UP: Transforms the user into suit-up form upon the command .
DASH GO: Launches a Rescue Dash vehicle from a Falcon vehicle.
SCRAMBLE: Starts the Rescue Vehicles.
FINAL RESCUE: Executes the Rescue Vehicles' Final Rescue.
FALCON UP: Combines Falcon vehicles upon the command .

X-Basher
The  is Fire-1 X's personal suit-up and rescue tool. Over time, the orbs have disappeared and the sword became embedded in its resting place behind Donkaen's throne until Asuka finds and frees it. Though it was heavy and rusted, the Ryudouken transforms when it reacts to Fire-1's Rescue Soul. Turning its key to various modes allows the user to relay commands. Its Sword Mode is activated by spinning its  and performing a Dragon Charge on a Rescue Soul. The weapon was left behind with Donkaen after Fire 1X chose to seal him by freezing him instead dealing a fatal blow.

X-FIRE UP: Transforms Fire-1 into Fire-1 X form upon the command  with a 5-minute limit.
F-RESCUE: Executes Rescue King's Final Rescue.

Rescue Breaker
The  is the team's other common handheld tool with eight modes, previously used by the Rescue Force. It is usually in  until needed.
: A hammer mode.
: An axe mode. Used primarily by Yuma.
: A pick mode.
: A manipulator mode.
: A drill mode.
: A simple information analysis mode that can be used also as a digital camera.
: A rope mode.

Episodes

Cast
Tatsuya Homura/Fire-1: 
Yuma Megumi/Fire-2: 
Ritsuka Yuki/Fire-3: 
Tsubasa Aoi/Fire-4: 
Jun Watari/Fire-5: 
Riku Taiga: 
Tamami Sugiyama: 
Reiji Osakabe: 
Naoshi Taiga: 
Asuka Taiga: 
Q-suke (Voice): 
AI (Voice): , Reiko Takagi
Donkaen (Voice): , 
Jokaen (Voice): 
Chukaen (Voice): 
Ukaen (Voice): 
Sakaen (Voice):

Suit actors
Fire-1: 
Fire-2: 
Fire-3: 
Fire-4: 
Fire-5: 
Jokaen: 
Chukaen: 
Ukaen: 
Sakaen:

Songs
Opening themes

Lyrics & Composition: Hironobu Kageyama
Arrangement: Masaki Suzuki
Artist: JAM Project
Episodes: 1-29

Lyrics & Composition: Hironobu Kageyama
Arrangement: Masaki Suzuki
Artist: JAM Project
Episodes: 30-51

Ending themes

Lyrics: Kenta Harada
Composition, Arrangement, & Performance: Rey
Episodes: 1-29

Lyrics & Composition: Hiroshi Kitadani
Arrangement: Yoshichika Kuriyama & Shiho Terada
Choreography: Hiromichi Sato
Artist: Hiroshi Kitadani
Episodes: 30-50

Lyrics & Composition: Hironobu Kageyama
Arrangement: Masaki Suzuki
Artist: JAM Project
Episodes: 51
Insert songs
"Rescue Dream!"
Lyrics: Kenta Harada
Composition: Shinya Tasaki
Arrangement & Performance: Rey
"Three souls"
Lyrics & Composition: Hiroshi Kitadani
Arrangement: R·O·N
Artist: JAM Project

Lyrics: Kenta Harada
Composition: Shinya Tasaki
Arrangement & Performance: Rey

Lyrics & Composition: Masaaki Endoh
Arrangement: Hirofumi Miyake
Artist: Masaaki Endoh

References

External links
Rescue Fire at TV Aichi 
Rescue Fire at Takara Tomy 

2009 Japanese television series debuts
Sequel television series
Tokusatsu television series
Takara Tomy
Works about lifesaving